Mouna-Hodan Ahmed (born 1972) is a writer from Djibouti, one of the few women writers in the country. Born into a family of five children, she completed her primary and secondary schooling in Djibouti before pursuing higher education in France.  She then returned to her native country to teach. Her first novel, Les enfants du khat, was published in 2002.

References

1972 births
Living people
Djiboutian women writers
Djiboutian novelists
Women novelists
21st-century novelists
21st-century women writers
Djiboutian educators